Diduga haematomiformis is a moth of the family Erebidae. It is found on Java.

References

Nudariina
Moths described in 1920